Highland Wildlife Management Area is a  Wildlife Management Area in Highland County, Virginia.

With the exception of an  clearing on Jack Mountain that was once used as summer pasture land, the area is nearly completely covered by upland hardwood forest, consisting mainly of oaks and hickories. The Bullpasture River flows through the area and is regularly stocked with trout. The area is carefully managed to enhance wildlife habitat, including maintaining small clearings as open space for wildlife, and encouraging the growth of mast-producing trees to provide food.

Highland Wildlife Management Area is owned and maintained by the Virginia Department of Game and Inland Fisheries. The area is open to the public for hunting, trapping, fishing, hiking, horseback riding, and primitive camping. Access for persons 17 years of age or older requires a valid hunting or fishing permit, or a WMA access permit.

See also
 List of Virginia Wildlife Management Areas

References

External links
Virginia Department of Game and Inland Fisheries: Highland Wildlife Management Area

Wildlife management areas of Virginia
Protected areas of Highland County, Virginia